Anne-Marie O'Connor is an American journalist and writer who authored The Lady in Gold: The Extraordinary Tale of Gustav Klimt's Masterpiece, Portrait of Adele Bloch-Bauer, the bestselling story of the battle by Vienna emigre Maria Altmann to reclaim five Gustav Klimt paintings from her native Austria in an eight-year legal battle by Los Angeles attorney E. Randol Schoenberg; a saga that also inspired a Harvey Weinstein movie, Woman in Gold, in which Helen Mirren played Maria Altmann.
One of the paintings, Portrait of Adele Bloch-Bauer I sold for a record $135 million in 2006, to Ronald Lauder's Neue Galerie New York, where the painting is on view.

Life
A longtime journalist in Latin America, O'Connor covered the civil wars in Nicaragua and El Salvador as a Central America bureau chief for Reuters. 
She was also a staff writer for the Los Angeles Times, the Miami Herald, UPI, and the Cox Newspaper chain, and has written for Esquire, the Christian Science Monitor, and The Nation. 
She is a speaker on the subject of the Nazi plunder of art and restitution.

Selected works

References

External links
Official website
Twitter

Living people
Year of birth missing (living people)
American women journalists
American women writers
Vassar College alumni
21st-century American women